Doublure may refer to:
Doublure (bookbinding), ornamental endleaf of a book
Doublure (biology), reflexed margin of a trilobite's carapace